The 1899 Haskell Indians football team was an American football team that represented the Haskell Indian Institute (now known as Haskell Indian Nations University) as an independent during the 1899 college football season. The team compiled a 4–5 record. Shorty Hamill and Wylie G. Woodruff coached the team.

Schedule

References

Haskell
Haskell Indian Nations Fighting Indians football seasons
Haskell Indians football